Attilio N. "Rocky" Castellani (May 26, 1926 – August 31, 2008) was an  American middleweight boxer.   He was the top rated contender for the world middleweight crown in 1954 when he fought Bobo Olson and in July 1955 when he lost to Sugar Ray Robinson.  These two exceptional fights were featured on ESPN's "Classic Fights of the Century".

Castellani was born in Luzerne County, Pennsylvania, to Attilio Castellani (1889–1974) and Rose Isopi Castellani (1896–1938), who later moved to Margate City, formerly South Atlantic City.  He began boxing as a teenager at local gyms, and at a younger age would box opponents to entertain neighborhood kids. As a young man, he fought as a Marine in the battle of Iwo Jima during World War II.  He boxed in the Marine Corps and won the title of "Champion of All China and Guam".  After his discharge from the Marines he embarked on his professional boxing career around 1945.

After a three-month layoff from the ring on May 7, 1949, Castellani handily defeated Tony DeMicco before 1435 fans in New York's St. Nicholas Arena in a well publicized ten round unanimous decision. Castellani staggered his opponent in the third round, winning the bout from long range, and defending DeMicco's attempts to fight inside. Castellani was voted Ring Magazine's "Rookie of the Year" in 1948.

On September 9, 1949, Castellani lost to skilled middleweight Kid Gavilan in a ten-round unanimous decision at Madison Square Garden.  All three judges scored for Gavilan by a significant margin of winning rounds.  Castellani was knocked down in both rounds two and three, but surged in the middle rounds despite his hard tumble in round two.  Castellani showed conditioning and skill but suffered in points from his two knockdowns.  The Associated Press gave six rounds to Gavilan, and only three to Castellani, as did one of the judges.

In a noteworthy victory on November 14, 1951, Castellani defeated Joey Giardello before 1,932 in a convincing ten-round decision in Scranton, Pennsylvania. Giardello would become an exceptional boxer, taking the WBA World Middleweight Title between 1963 and 1965.  Castellani took charge of the future champion between the fourth and the ninth, though appeared to be coasting.  He had taken four months off from a rib injury he received during training.

On June 18, 1952, Castellani defeated Johnny Bratton at Chicago Stadium. Both judges scored the fight closely, but the referee gave a larger ten point margin to Bratton. Bratton was a noteworthy opponent who would compete for the World Middleweight Title on November 13, 1953, against Kid Galavan at Chicago Stadium, though he lost by large points margin.

World middleweight championship contention

On January 9, 1953, Castellani defeated Ralph Jones at Madison Square Garden before 5,400 fans in an important win before a home crowd that clearly favored Castellani as their local boy.  The Associated Press gave the fight to Rocky, winning six rounds, losing three, and drawing one.  Only one judge dissented from a voting for Castellani, resulting in a split decision.  The win moved Castellani to the second round of the World Middleweight Championship tournament to meet Sugar Ray Robinson for the title.  Jones was never able to fight in close as Castellani circled, jabbed, hooked, and threw leading rights. Castellani clinched, armlocked or hugged when Jones attempted in-fighting, and was also successful at backing away to avoid the close shots at which Jones could be dangerous.  His ability to backpedal so effectively may have indicated better conditioning than his opponent.  There were no knockdowns in the close bout in which Castellani seemed to employ a more effective strategy. The bout was a convincing display of in-fighting defense by Castellani, who claimed he had learned Jones's style by watching his bout with Johnny Bratton on television.  Jones' strongest winning round was the fifth when he swept Castellani with sweeping body attacks, and he was down from slips in the seventh and tenth rounds.

On February 6, 1953, Castellani lost to Frenchman Pierre Langlois in twelve rounds before 4,887 fans in a Madison Garden upset Split Decision.  The bout confirmed Castellani's standing as the top contender for the title in the United States.  Notably, the match became Castellani's exit from a World Middleweight Title elimination tournament. Castellani led the pre-fight betting 3–1 over the Frenchman who had a spotty record and was not well known to the New York fans.  In an extremely close split decision, two of the judges scored for Langlois but only by one point.   Langlois's strong finish in the final two rounds sealed his victory, and he appeared the aggressor throughout the bout, but Castellani's speed and footwork remained impressive in the very close bout.  A critical question was whether Castellani had been knocked down in the eleventh round or pushed.  The judges disagreed on the issue, and it swayed one judge and referee Ruby Goldstein's scoring in favor of Langlois in the close bout.  Eleven of fifteen boxing writers thought Castellani had won, but the judges who believed Castellani had been knocked down in the eleventh from a blow by Langlois gave the decision to him and removed Rocky's hopes to advance in the tournament.  The United Press gave only a slimmest one point lead in their determination of who won the match.  The loss ended Castellani's goal of making an immediate shot at the World Middleweight Title against Sugar Ray Robinson, but he would get his chance at the reigning champion two years later in a non-title bout.

The highlight of Castellani's career was his ten-round split decision near Hollywood, California on July 22, 1955, against Hall of Famer and world middleweight champion Sugar Ray Robinson. Castellani lost the split decision but knocked Robinson down in the sixth round for a count of nine, though Robinson quickly rose and resumed the bout.  After his knockdown, Robinson rallied quickly, leading the bout with furious body punching which impressed the judges.  He had difficulty going to the head of Castellani, though he did at times when his opponent occasionally lowered his defense.  The thrilling spectacle which attracted 8,230 featured a close contest between Castellani, the top contender for the middleweight championship and Robinson, who would successfully defend his title against Bobo Olson in his next fight on December 9, 1955.  Robinson called upon all his fifteen years of boxing experience to win the bout against a skilled opponent who was nearly his equal if only for ten rounds.

A year earlier on August 20, 1954, Castellani lost a unanimous fifteen-round decision before a crowd of 11,000 to Carl "Bobo" Olson for the World Middleweight Title in Daly City.  Olson was the World Middleweight Champion from 1953 to 1955.  In the eleventh, Olson was down for a three count when his legs tangled with his opponent's, but Castellani was down for a full nine count in the twelfth from a crushing right overhand from Olson.  In the remaining three rounds, Castellani, wounded and exhausted, backpedaled and held to finish the bout.  The fight was largely one sided in the final three rounds, but the judges' scoring showed the effort made by Castellani to remain in the bout for the first ten rounds.

On January 4, 1956, Castellani lost to talented middleweight Gene Fullmer in a televised bout at the Arena in Cleveland, losing in a very close, ten round Split Decision. Many of the crowd of 1,487, as well as the judges and reporters disagreed on the outcome of the fight. Two of the judges gave the bout to Fullmer by a margin of only three points or less, with one judge dissenting.  The Associated Press disagreed with the official ruling, giving the fight to Castellani by a close margin of 97–93. The United Press gave the close bout to Fullmer, however, by a score of 98–91.  Fullmer may have won the bout by taking the lead in the boxing, while Castellani continuously countered and defended many of Fullmer's blows.  Fullmer established a hit and hold technique that helped him win the infighting by a shade.  When Castellani went to the inside, Fullmer frequently landed blows to Castellani's mid-section, usually with his left.  In the late sixth, Fullmer took the lead opening a gash on Fullmer, and then pounded what was already his aching mid-section to take the seventh, his best round.  The tenth was a close and furious round where Castellani may have been trying for a knockout as his only hope, but Fullmer countered effectively to keep the round and the bout close.  Fullmer was rated fourth in the world middleweight standings behind Castellani who was rated among the top three contenders for the crown.

On August 3, 1956, Castellani lost to skilled middleweight Joey Giambra by a significant points margin in a ten-round split decision at Madison Square Garden.  Giambra in pre-fight betting had an 8–5 lead over his opponent, and proved his advantage in the fight. Castellani retreated constantly throughout the first five rounds only rarely moving to make a punch and unable to face the stronger, and better skilled Giambra.  Giambra cornered Castellani in the sixth against the ropes, throwing blows with both hands, with Castellani having trouble. Weakened in the final four rounds, and moving slower, the action picked up.

On December 10, 1956, Giambra defeated Castellani again in a ten-round unanimous decision at the Civic Auditorium in San Francisco. Giambra seemed clearly behind in the first three rounds scoring at long range with left hooks and right leads.  Giambra rallied, however, and scored in the fourth and fifth with combinations to the head, making Rocky appear wobbly.  In the fifth, Giambra scored with combinations to the face, abandoning his signature left hook.  He stayed with the combination, and it paid off especially in the ninth when he dropped Castellani in the ninth for a three count.  Giambra felt Castellani had performed better than in their previous August fight. Giambra praised Castellani for his ring generalship that carried him through the final six rounds, after Giambra had pounded him against the ropes in the fourth and the end looked near for his opponent.  Though only three years younger, Giambra looked a decade younger than the veteran Castellani in both their 1956 meetings.

He finished his career with a 65–14–4 record.

A biography of Castellani is entitled Young Rocky: A True Story of Attilio "Rocky" Castellani by Joe Kinney.

Retirement from boxing
After retiring from boxing around 1957, he became a tavern owner at Rocky Castellani and Sons in Atlantic City and Galloway Township, New Jersey and sponsored local youth sports' teams.  Continuing to contribute to the sport he loved, he served as a judge for the New Jersey Boxing Commission and coached youth boxing.

He was inducted into both the Pennsylvania and New Jersey Boxing Halls of Fame and was later inducted into the Pennsylvania Sports Hall of Fame.

He died in Atlantic City, New Jersey at the AtlantiCare Regional Medical Center on August 31, 2008. He was survived by his wife Mary, to whom he was married 58 years, and three sons, a daughter, and ten grandchildren.  He was buried at the Atlantic County Veteran's Cemetery.

Professional boxing record

References

External links
 
 Obituary

1926 births
2008 deaths
People from Luzerne County, Pennsylvania
Middleweight boxers
American sports businesspeople
United States Marine Corps personnel of World War II
Sportspeople from Atlantic City, New Jersey
American male boxers
Boxers from New Jersey
United States Marines
Battle of Iwo Jima